Dubyazsky District was a district (raion) of the Tatar ASSR.

It had an area of about 900 square kilometers in 1947 and a population of 25,563 in 1959.

It was established on February 10, 1930.  Its administrative center was the village (selo) of Dubyazy. On January 4, 1963, the district was abolished and its territory was transferred to Zelenodolsky and Vysokogorsky Districts.

References

History of Tatarstan
States and territories established in 1930
States and territories disestablished in 1963